Dorothy "Dot" A. Kelly Gay is an Irish-born American politician who served as Mayor of Somerville, Massachusetts and on the Massachusetts Governor's Council.

Early life
Gay was born on April 26, 1943 in Ballinasloe, County Galway, Ireland. Her father was a politician, nurse and union activist. She graduated from Newtown National School, Convent of Mercy Secondary School, and Ballinasloe Technical School. In 1961 she moved to England to pursue a career in nursing. She graduated from the Mayday Hospital School of Nursing in Surrey in 1964. In the early 1960s she met Bertram Gay in London. The couple later married and in 1968 they immigrated to the United States because their child needed a surgery that was only available Boston Children's Hospital. They settled in Somerville and the couple soon found employment, with Gay getting hired at Somerville's Heritage Hospital. She continued to work as a nurse until 1999.

Political career
In 1986, Kelly Gay was appointed to the Somerville School Committee. She was elected to a full term ten months later. In 1992 Gay was elected to the Massachusetts Governor's Council in the 6th District. In 1998 she ran for Lieutenant Governor of Massachusetts. Gay lost in the Democratic primary to State Senator Warren Tolman 270,791 (54%) votes to 232,250 (46%).

In 1999, Gay was elected Mayor of Somerville in a special election to succeed Michael Capuano, who was elected to the United States House of Representatives. She defeated alderman John Buonomo 6878 votes to 6473. She ran for a full term later that year and was elected unopposed. In 2003, Gay finished third in the preliminary election behind Alderman Joseph Curtatone and businessman Tony Lafuente. Gay's loss was blamed on increasing gang violence, declining economic growth, and cuts in state aid that forced her to cut public services and fire 200 municipal workers.

References

1943 births
Living people
20th-century Irish people
People from County Galway
Irish emigrants to the United Kingdom
Irish emigrants to the United States
Massachusetts Democrats
Mayors of Somerville, Massachusetts
Members of the Massachusetts Governor's Council
School board members in Massachusetts
Women mayors of places in Massachusetts
21st-century American women